Gene Goodman may refer to:

 Gene Goodman, candidate in the 2010 United States House of Representatives elections in Michigan
 Gene Goodman, inductee of the Songwriters Hall of Fame and 1997 winner of the Abe Olman Publisher Award

See also
 Gene Goldman (born 1953), American space agency executive
 Eugene Goodman, police officer
 Eugene Goodman (businessman)